"Shake" is the third single from the Ying Yang Twins album, U.S.A. (United State of Atlanta).  It features the rapper Pitbull. The song contains a sample of "Din Daa Daa" by George Kranz.

The official remix features Pitbull with a new verse and Elephant Man, featured in the Ying Yang Twins' U.S.A. Still United and Pitbull's Money Is Still a Major Issue.

The song makes a reference to the songs "The New Workout Plan" by Kanye West and "Back that Azz Up" by Juvenile.

The music video had heavy airplay on BET, MTV and VH1. The video was directed by Life Garland.

For radio and television, a re-recorded version was released, replacing for instance "Where niggas go to see naked hoes" with "Where brothers go to see girls come out them clothes."

Charts

References

2005 singles
Pitbull (rapper) songs
Ying Yang Twins songs
2005 songs
Songs written by Pitbull (rapper)
Songs written by Mr. Collipark
Dirty rap songs